Gennady Pavlovich Yakovlev (born 7 June 1938) Russian botanist, pharmacognosist, phytochemist. Former director of Saint-Petersburg State Chemical-Pharmaceutical Academy (1992–2004). Expert in Fabaceae taxonomy.

Plants authored by G. P. Yakovlev
 Acosmium panamense (Benth.)Yakovlev
Chamaecrista takhtajanii Barreto et Yakovlev
 Calia conzatti (Stanley)Yakovlev (Styphnolobium conzatti Sousa & Rudd)
 Sophora gibbosa Yakovlev (S. gibbosa O.Kuntze as cited by Tsong and Ma 1981)
Sophora tomentosa subsp australis Yakovlev

Works
Заметки по систематике и географии рода Sophora L. и близких родов. [Zametki po sistematike i geographii roda Sophora L. i blizkikh rodov. Systematical and geographical studies of genus Sophora L. and allied genera]// Труды Ленинградского химико-фармацевтического института. 1967 21: 42-62.
Yakovlev, G.P.; Syrovezhko, N.V. 1967. [Nekotorye osobennosti stroeniyasemyan roda Sophora L. i blizkikh k nemu rodov v svyazi s ikh sistematikoi i filogeniei] Trudy Leningradskogo khimico-farmacevticheskogo instituta. 21:90-98.
Yakovlev, G.P. & O.A. Svyazeva. 1987. Zametki o vidakh sektsii Caragana roda Caragana Lam. (Fabaceae) Novosti syst. Vyssh. Rast. 24:126
Yakovlev G.P., Sytin A.K., Roskov Yu.R. 1996. Legumes of Northern Eurasia. A checklist. Published by Royal Botanic Gardens Kew., 482-503

References
Barreto, A. & G. P. Yakovlev. 1990. [The new Chamaecrista taxa (Leguminosae, Caesalpiniaceae) from Cuba.] Bot. Zhurn. 75: 888- 893.

Notes and references

Soviet botanists
Living people
1938 births
Place of birth missing (living people)
20th-century Russian botanists
21st-century Russian botanists